Anuradha Koirala (born Anuradha Gurung on 14 April 1949), Okaldhunga district, is a Nepalese social activist and the founder of Maiti Nepal – a non-profit organization in Nepal, dedicated to helping victims of sex trafficking. She was appointed as 1st Governor of Bagmati Province from (17 January 2018 – 3 November 2019) by the Government of Nepal.

'Anuradha Koirala was the first child of the colonel Pratap Singh Gurung and Laxmi Devi Gurung. She belonged to an educated family and had a great opportunity for education at St. Joseph Convent School. Before she started Maiti-Nepal, she spent 20 years as a teacher, teaching English in different schools in Kathmandu. 

Currently, Maiti Nepal operates a rehabilitation home in Kathmandu, as well as transit homes at the Indo-Nepal border towns, preventive homes in the countryside, and an academy in Kathmandu. As the name suggests, Maiti Nepal ("Maiti" means "mother's home" in Nepali) has been a refuge for women rescued from the brothels in India. The women can stay in the homes run by Maiti Nepal until they can return to their homes, or if not accepted by their parents and society, they may stay until they become able to live on their own.
Between 1993 and 2022, she and her organization have helped rescue and rehabilitate more than 50,002 women and girls.

Maiti Nepal also works on reuniting the rescued women with their families, patrolling the Indo-Nepal border with police and other law enforcement authorities, and also rescuing trafficked women from brothels in India with the help of Indian authorities.

Koirala received the Courage of Conscience Award from The Peace Abbey in Sherborn, Massachusetts on 25 August 2006. She won the CNN Hero of the Year award in 2010. She has been called the "Mother Teresa" of Nepal for her work.

The United States government gave a two-year grant of $500,000 (52124000. 00 in Nepali rupees) to Maiti Nepal in April 2010.

In November 2017, Koirala joined Nepali Congress party.

Awards and recognitions

Koirala received the Best Social Worker of the Year Award (Nepal) in 1998, the Prabal Gorkha Dakshin Bahu Medal (Nepal) in 1999, the Trishaktipatta Award in 2002, the Courage of Conscience Award from The Peace Abbey Foundation in 2006, German UNIFEM Prize in 2007 and Queen Sofia Silver Medal Award in 2007.

She was presented with the CNN Heroes Award 2010 in Los Angeles, California. She was introduced by Demi Moore and Ashton Kutcher on stage. She received USD 100,000 to continue her work with Maiti Nepal, in addition to USD 25,000 as a token of appreciation from CNN.

She received the Mother Teresa Award in 2014.

Koirala was also honored with Acharya Tulsi Kartritva Puraskar by Akhil Bhartiya Terapanth Mahila Mandal in 2014.

Koirala was conferred India's fourth highest civilian award Padma Shri in April 2017 by president Pranab Mukherjee. In 2018 Koirala received the G.O.D. Award.

See also
Social worker
People of Nepal
Pushpa Basnet
Godawari vidhya Mandir
Rangu Souriya
Prof. Dr. Govinda Bahadur Tumbahang
Ratneshwar Lal Kayastha
Baburam Kunwar
Durga Keshar Khanal
Mohan Raj Malla
Nepali Women's Power

References

External links
MAITI Nepal
The Peace Abbey Courage of Conscience Recipients List
CNN Heroes
https://maitinepal.org 

1949 births
Living people
Nepalese activists
Nepalese women activists
Nepalese social workers
Human trafficking in Nepal
Nepalese Hindus
People from Okhaldhunga District
Recipients of the Padma Shri in social work
Governors of Bagmati Province
Women's rights in Nepal